All Grown Up may refer to:
 All Grown Up!, an American animated television series
 All Grown Up, a 2016 album by Brokencyde
 All Grown Up, a 2017 novel by Jami Attenberg
 All Grown Up, a 2018 Filipino documentary film
 All Grown Up, the series finale of Arthur
 WrestleMania 23, tagline "All Grown Up"